Sam Johnson (born November 25, 1960) is a former American football defensive back who played one season with the Philadelphia Stars of the United States Football League. He played college football at the University of North Carolina.

References

External links
Just Sports Stats
College stats

Living people
1960 births
American football defensive backs
North Carolina Tar Heels football players
Philadelphia/Baltimore Stars players